Madho Jhanda  is a village in Kapurthala district of Punjab State, India. The village is administrated by a Sarpanch who is an elected representative of village as per the constitution of India and Panchayati raj (India).There are number of religious places in the village like Gurudwara Sahib Baba Sandhiya Das Ji, and Darbar Peer Baba Lakh Data Sahib Ji Sarkar, Madho Jhanda.

Demography 
According to the report published by Census India in 2011, Madho Jhanda has total number of 129 houses and population of 650 of which include 320 males and 330 females. Literacy rate of Madho Jhanda is 69.04%, lower than state average of 75.84%.  The population of children under the age of 6 years is 75 which is 11.54% of total population of Madho Jhanda, and child sex ratio is approximately  705, lower than state average of 846.

Population data

Air travel connectivity 
The closest airport to the village is Sri Guru Ram Dass Jee International Airport.

Villages in Kapurthala

References

External links
  Villages in Kapurthala
 Kapurthala Villages List

Villages in Kapurthala district